Kim Seong-Kon (born 9 August 1949 in South Korea), also known as Seong-Kon Kim, is a South Korean academic, literary critic, film critic, columnist, editor and writer.

Kim was the president of the LTI Korea (Literature Translation Institute of Korea) in the Ministry of Culture, Sports and Tourism of South Korea, which was an undersecretary-level post. On May 19, 2017, Kim received an honorary Doctorate of Humane Letters from the State University of New York "in recognition of the profound impact Professor Kim has had as a cultural and literary bridge between Korea and the United States." In 2018, Kim taught at George Washington University as Dean's Distinguished Visiting professor in the Humanities and also at the University of Málaga in Spain as a visiting professor. In the same year, Kim was decorated by Felipe VI, King of Spain, with La Orden del Merito Civil (Cruz de Oficial). In 2019, Kim taught at the University of California, Irvine, as a visiting professor. Currently, he is a visiting scholar at Dartmouth College.

Early life and education

Kim received his Ph.D. in English from the State University of New York at Buffalo, under the direction of the late Leslie A. Fiedler who first announced the Death of the Novel in the early sixties. Then he went to Columbia University to study comparative literature under the late Edward W. Said who authored "Orientalism." Upon completion of the Ph.D. coursework at Columbia, he joined the faculty of Seoul National University (SNU) in 1984.

Career

Academia
Kim was dean of the SNU School of Language Education (2001–2005), director of the Language Research Institute (2001), director of the American Studies Institute (1999–2001), and director of the SNU Residence Hall (1987–1989) of Seoul National University. He was also director of the Seoul National University Press (2009–2011) and president of the Association of Korean University Presses (2010–2011). Kim was also chairman of the organizing committee for the annual BESETO (Beijing, Seoul and Tokyo) International Conference (1999–2001). In addition, Kim was president of the LTI Translation Academy, which offers various courses on translation studies for foreign and domestic students, and publisher of the LTI Korea Press and the quarterly English literary journal, Korean Literature Now.         
         
He was the founding president of the Korean Association of Literature and Film from 1998 to 2001, and was president of the International Association of Comparative Korean Studies from 2001 to 2003, president of the Korean Association of Modern Fiction in English from 2004 to 2006, and president of the American Studies Association of Korea from 2007 to 2008. Kim was chairman of the Development and Promotion Council of the English Language and Literature Association of Korea from 2004 to 2005.

Kim has taught at Pennsylvania State University, University of California, Berkeley, and Brigham Young University as a visiting professor, and conducted research at Harvard Yenching Institute, University of Oxford and University of Toronto as a visiting scholar. A prizewinning literary critic, Kim initiated the debate on literary postmodernism for the first time in Korea in the late 1970s and early 1980s. He was also a pioneer in postcolonialism and cultural studies in Korea. His books on postmodernism, postcolonialism, and cultural studies have greatly influenced writers and scholars in the Korean republic of letters. In 2008, Kim received the prestigious Kim Hwantae Award for Literary Criticism and in 2014 the Woo Ho Humanities Award.

Kim was editor of literary journals such as Literature & Thought, 21st Century Literature and Contemporary World Literature. In addition, Kim has been a regularly featured columnist for the Korea Herald since 2003. His Herald columns have frequently appeared in international media such as The Nation, the Progressive Party, USA, the China Post, the AsiaOne, the Pakistan Observer, the Star, Yahoo! News, the Asian Views, The Straits Times, The Kathmandu Post, The Statesman, The World Weekly and others. He was also appointed co-editor of Korea Journal published by the Korean National Commission for UNESO for 2015–2016. In 2017 Kim was asked by the New York Times to write a column for the editorial/opinion page.

Kim was designated dean of international affairs at Seoul National University, a Research Member of the South Korea's Presidential Council on National Cohesion, and chairman of the Korean Culture Overseas Promotion Council in the Ministry of Culture. Actively engaged in promoting Korean literature overseas, Kim was vice president of the Seoul Literary Society which consisted of foreign ambassadors and high-ranking diplomats stationed in Seoul (2012–2017) and is a member of the advisory committee on Korean literature of White Pine Press in New York. Kim is also honorary president of the State University of New York at Buffalo Alumni Association's South Korea chapter.

In addition, Kim received the CU Distinguished Alumnus Award (2009), the Fulbright Distinguished Alumnus Award (2010), and the SUNY/Buffalo International Distinguished Alumni Award (2012). Kim has also been featured regularly on the covers and in special editions of prestigious literary journals. In 2016, for example, "Writer’s World" featured a special edition on Kim in the winter issue and "Literature & Thought," too, published a special edition on Kim in the August issue. In 2019, Kim also appeared on the cover of the December issue of "Literature & Thought." Recently, his name entered the Hall of Fame of the Seoul National University Foundation. In 2015, Kim received the Distinguished Teaching Professor Award from the Central Government Officials’ Training Institute in the Ministry of Interior and his name entered the Hall of Fame in 2018. In 2022, his name also entered the Hall of Fame of the College of the Humanities, Seoul National University. 

In 2015 Kim was appointed as the speaker of two prestigious lectures: the KRF (Korea Research Foundation) Distinguished Professor Lecture and the NAVER Cultural Foundation Lecture. In the same year, Kim was also selected as one of “the 50 Representative Literary Critics of Korea since 1900” by the Association of Korean Literary Critics. In 2016, Kim was appointed as chairman of the Asia Culture Forum and a member of the Korea-China Cultural Exchange Council by the Ministry of Culture, Sports, and Tourism. In the same year, he was appointed as a part-time visiting professor at the National Human Resources Institute in the Ministry of Personnel Management. In 2016, Kim was awarded the Plaque of Distinguished Accomplishment on behalf of LTI Korea from the Management Assessment Team of the Ministry of Culture, Sports and Tourism. In 2017, Kim was appointed as head judge of the prestigious Ho-am Prize Selection Committee, a Korean version of the Nobel Prize, and also the Segye Ilbo Literary Prize. Presently, he is a judge for the two prestigious literary awards: the Yi Sang Literary Award and the Park Kyungni Literary Prize.

Professional career
He was chairman of the board of trustees at LTI Korea. In February 2015 Kim was reappointed president of LTI Korea by the Korean government to lead the institution for another three years. Kim is also former dean and professor emeritus at Seoul National University where he was selected for the Distinguished Professor for Research Award seven times. In 2016, Kim was appointed as an undersecretary level member of the Public Diplomacy Council in the Ministry of Foreign Affairs. 

Kim was editor of the prestigious literary quarterly, Contemporary World Literature (1988–1988), and editor-in-chief of the celebrated monthly literary magazine, Literature and Thought (2002–2005), and co-editor of 21st Century Literature together with the late Yi Chong-jun, Kim Yun-shik, Yoon Hu-myong and Kim Jong-hoe (1998–2012).

As vice chair of the Seoul International Forum for Literature in 2000, 2005, and 2011, Kim worked with the eminent scholar and literary critic Kim Uchang and together brought a host of celebrated international writers to Seoul, including Pierre Bourdieu, Jean Baudrillard, Le Clezio, Orhan Pamuk, Oe Kenzaburo, Gary Snyder, Robert Coover, Robert Hass, Margaret Drabble, Gao Xingjian, Bei Dao and others.

A self-appointed cultural diplomat, Kim taught South Korean diplomats at the Institute of Foreign Affairs and National Security (1988–1994), and gave lectures extensively on Korean culture and society for foreign diplomats at the KOICA (Korea International Cooperation Agency) and at the COTI (Central Officials Training Institute) in the Ministry of Foreign Affairs (1997–present).

Administrative positions
President, LTI Korea Translation Academy, 2012–2017
Publisher, LTI Korea Press, 2012–2017
Publisher, Korean Literature Now, 2012–2017
Director, Seoul National University Press, 2009–2011
Dean, SNU Language School, Seoul National University, 2001–2005
Director, American Studies Institute, Seoul National University, 1999–2001
Director, SNU Student Residence Hall

Overseas teaching and research career
University of California, Irvine, visiting professor, 2019
Universidad de Malaga, Spain, Profesor Visitante/ Universidad Docente e Investigador, 2018–2019
Dean's Distinguished Visiting Professor, George Washington University, 2018–2018
Visiting professor, SUNY/Buffalo, 2011–2012
Visiting professor, Univ. of California, Berkeley, 2006–2006 Taught Asian Literature
Visiting professor, Brigham Young University, 1996–1997 Taught Korean Literature
Visiting professor, Pennsylvania State Univ. Fulbright Asian Scholar-in-Residence, 1990–1991 Taught English & Comp. Lit
Visiting scholar (associate), Harvard University Yenching Institute, 2006–2007
Visiting fellow, Rockefellow Center, State University of New York at Buffalo, 1992
Visiting scholar, Oxford University, 1991
Visiting scholar, University of Toronto, 1991

Awards and honors

La Orden del Merito Civil (The Order of Chivalry), Spain, 2018
Order of the Jade (for Distinguished Service), South Korea, 2014
Medal of Cultural Diplomacy, The Czech Republic, 2013
Distinguished Teaching Professor Award, Central, Officials Training Institute, 2014
Best Public Institution Director Award, Ministry of Culture, 2013
SUNY International Distinguished Alumni Award, 2012.

SNU Distinguished Research Award, (7 times), 1998, 1999, 2007, 2008, 2009, 2010, 2011
Fulbright Distinguished Alumnus Award, 2010
CU Distinguished Alumnus Award, 2009
SNU Best Institute Director Award, 2003, 2004

Wu Ho Humanities Award, 2014
50 Best Literary Critics in the 20th Century, selected, Association of Korean Literary Critics, 2014
Best Books of 2010 awarded by the National Academy of Sciences (Literature in the Age of Hybrid Cultures)
Kim Hwantae Literary Award for Criticism, 2008
Today's Book Award, for Interviews with American Writers, 1985
Books of the Year, awarded by the Ministry of Culture (3 times)
Selected “2012 Best Literary Criticism” (“Literature and Game”)
Selected “Best Book on Literature and Film” Essays on Film, 1992
Representative Translator of Korea, selected, Journal of Publications, 1990
Selected "Best Books in the 1990s" by Kyobo Essay on Film
Selected “24 Best Books on Foreign Literature since the Liberation” Words in the Labyrinth: Interviews with American Writers, 1989
Selected “Representative Books of the 1980s” American Literature in the Postmodern Age, 1989
SNU President's Distinguished Service Plaque, 2001, 2011, 2014
SNU Outstanding Service Award, 2004
Korea Research Foundation Overseas Teaching Grant, 1996–1997
British Council Grant, 1991 (Oxford University)
Canadian Faculty Enrichment Grant, 1991 (University of Toronto)
Asian Scholar-in-Residence Award, Pennsylvania State University, 1990–1991
Fulbright Scholarship, 1978–1984
SNU  Overseas Research Grant (UC Berkeley/ Harvard)
Superintendent Award for the Valedictorian, 1967
Minister of Education Award, 1966

Invited lectures
 Cornell University, 1990 (U.S.)
 Stanford University, 1991 (U.S.)
 Pennsylvania State University, 1990, 1991 (U.S.)
 State University of New York at Buffalo, 1992 (U.S.)
 University of Tokyo, 1999, 2002 (Japan)
 Peking University, 2003, 2010 (China)
 University of Paris XIII, 2004 (France)
 University of Saarbrucken, 2010 (Germany)
 State University of New York at Buffalo, 2011–2012 (U.S.)
 Institut National des Langues et Civilisations Orientale, 2016 (France)
 University of Warsaw, 2017 (Poland) 
 George Washington University, 2018 The Kim-Renaud Lecture (U.S.)
 Ohio State University, 2018 (U.S.)
 Universidad de Malaga, 2019 (Spain)
 University of California, Irvine, 2019 (U.S.)

Overseas publications (books) 
 Simple Etiquette in Korea. Kent, UK: Paul Nobury (Curzon Press), 1988. Co-authored with O Young Lee (former Minister of Culture)
 Korea Briefing. Boulder: Associated University Press, 1991. (author of one chapter)
 Crosscurrents in the Literatures of Asia and the West. Newark: Associated UP, 1997. (chapter author)
 Postmodernism in Asia. Tokyo: University of Tokyo, 2003 (chapter author)
 Intellectual History of Korea. Tokyo: Cuon Press, 2014 (chapter author)

Authored books
 Simple Etiquette in Korea. Kent, UK: Paul Norbury (Curzon Press), 1988. co-authored with O Young Lee, former Minister of Culture.
Journey into the Past. Seoul: SNU Press, 1985. (in English)
Conversations with American Writers. Seoul: Minumsa, 1986.
American Literature in the Postmodern Age. Seoul: SNU Press, 1989.
Postmodernism and Contemporary American Fiction, Seoul: Yoleumsa, 1990.
Portrait of American Literature and Its Writers. Seoul: SNU Press, 1993. (Selected “Best Books of the Year,” Ministry of Culture)
Essays on Film. Seoul: Yoleumsa, 1994. (Used as a textbook at the University of Washington, Also, a chapter is included in a high school textbook and college textbooks, 2011)
Literature in the Age of New Media. Seoul: Minumsa, 1995.
Literature and Film. Seoul: Minumsa, 1996.
Contemporary American Literature. Seoul: Minumsa, 1996.
Hollywood: A Mirror of 20th Century Culture. Seoul: Woongjin, 1996.
Odyssey in Film. Seoul: Hyohyung, 2001.
Korea in the Age of Multiculturalism. Seoul: Yoleumsa, 2002.
Reading Culture in the Age of Fusion Culture. Seoul: L&T, 2003.
Cultural Studies and the Future of the Humanities. Seoul: SNU Press, 2003. Selected “Best Books of the Year,” Ministry of Culture
Reading Culture in Film. Seoul: SNU Press, 2003.
Reading America in Hollywood Film. Seoul: Sallim, 2005.
Edgar Allan Poe. Seoul: Sallim, 2005
J. D. Salinger and The Catcher in the Rye. Seoul: Sallim, 2005.
The Key to Thought: Literature. Seoul: Mountain Press, 2006.
Literature in the Globalizing Word. Seoul: Minumsa, 2006 Best Books of the Year by the Ministry of Culture
Literature in the Age of Hybrid Cultures. Seoul: SNU Press, 2009. Selected as the Best Books of 2010 Award by the National Academy of Sciences
Literature Across Boundaries, Seoul: Minumsa, 2013
Collected Works of Kim-Seong-Kon, Seoul: Knowledge, 2015
Reading American Culture and Society in American Literature. Seoul: Dong-in, 2016 
The First Time I Encountered Cinema. Seoul: Random House Korea, 2017. Revised and enlarged edition of Essays on Film. 
Future Culture: New Literary Movements after Postmodernism. Seoul: Literature & Thought. 2017. 
Humanities across Boundaries, Seoul: Sechang Publishing Co. 2017
Famous Scenes in Literary History: Seoul: Epiphany, 2017
Violence and Justice, Seoul: Gimyoungsa Viche, 2019 (Co-authored with Kyung-whan Ahn)

Edited books
The Death of the Novel and Postmodernism. Ed. Seong-Kon Kim. Attic Publishing Co.
100 Cultural Keywords in the 21st Century. Ed. Seong-Kon Kim. Research Institute of Korean Publications & Marketing
Korean Poetry. Co-edited with Yong-jik Kim. KCAF
Journey to Mujin: Collection of Modern Korean Fiction. Co-edited with Yongjik Kim. KCAF
21st Century Literary Movements. Ed. Seong-Kon Kim. Literature & Thought Publishing Co.

Translations
From Korean into English:
Strong Winds at Mishi Pass. New York: White Pine Press, 2003. Poems of Hwang Tong-kyu, Co-trans. Seong-Kon Kim, Dennis Maloney
Woman on the Terrace. New York: White Pine Press, 2007.
Poems of Moon Chung-hee. Co-trans. Seong-Kon Kim. Alec Gordon
With this book, Poetess Moon was awarded the Cicada Award in Sweden.
The Square. A novel by Choi In-hun. Trans. Seong-Kon Kim. Urbana-Champaign: Dalkey Archive Press, 2014.
From English into Korean:
The Crying of Lot 49. Thomas Pynchon. Seoul: Minumsa.
The Narrative of Arthur Gordon Pym of Nantucket. Edgar Allan Poe. Golden Bough.
Trout Fishing in America. Richard Brautig. Vichae.
A Farewell to Arms. Ernest Hemingway. Sigongsa.
In Our Time. Ernest Hemingway. Sigongsa
Waiting for the End. Leslie A. Fiedler. Samsung.
Primitivism. Michael Bell. SNU Press
Love is a Fallacy: Collections of Postmodern Fiction. Borges et al. Woongjin.
 Selected Poems of Seamus Heaney. Seamus Heaney. Yeolumsa
Culture and Imperialism. Edward W. Said. co-trans. Hanshin
Postmodern Culture. Steven Corner. co-trans. Hanshin
American Literary Criticism. Vincent Leitch. Co-trans. Hanshin.
Mukarovsky's Poetics. Mukarovsky. Co-trans. Modern Literature Co.

References 

South Korean writers
South Korean male writers
1949 births
Living people
George Washington University faculty
Academic staff of Seoul National University
University at Buffalo alumni
Columbia Graduate School of Arts and Sciences alumni
South Korean columnists
South Korean literary critics
South Korean film critics
South Korean editors
University at Buffalo faculty
University of California, Berkeley faculty
University of California, Irvine faculty
Academic staff of the University of Málaga
Pennsylvania State University faculty
Brigham Young University faculty
Cultural diplomacy
Postcolonial theorists
Korean–English translators
English–Korean translators